Canadian Forces Intelligence Command (CFINTCOM) is the organization that centralizes all intelligence collection and assessment capabilities of the Canadian Armed Forces.

History
CFINTCOM was formed in 2013 by bringing the head of defence intelligence's office and all the CF's intelligence units into one military formation, replacing the Chief of Defence Intelligence Organisation.

In April 2020, Canadian media reported that CFINTCOM's Medical Intelligence Cell ((MEDINT) collected information related to the COVID-19 pandemic when the outbreak started at Wuhan.

In June 2021, it was reported that Major General Michael Wright assumed command of CFINTCOM. He replaces Vice Admiral Scott Bishop.

Formation
The main formation within the command is the Canadian Forces Intelligence Group (CF Int Gp), which consists of the following units:

 Canadian Forces Joint Imagery Centre (CFJIC)
 Canadian Forces National Counter-Intelligence Unit (CFNCIU)
 Joint Meteorological Centre (JMC)
 Mapping and Charting Establishment (MCE)
 Canadian Forces School of Military Intelligence (CFSMI)
 Joint Task Force X (JTF X)
 Medical Intelligence Cell

References

External links 
 

Military units and formations established in 2013
Commands of the Canadian armed forces
2013 establishments in Canada
Canadian intelligence agencies